Wolfsberg may refer to:

Places 
Wolfsberg, Carinthia, a district capital in Carinthia, Austria
 Wolfsberg Airport, a private use airport located near Wolfsberg, Carinthia, Austria
 Wolfsberg Castle (Carinthia), in Wolfsberg, Carinthia
 Wolfsberg Castle (Harz), a ruined castle in the Harz mountains, Saxony-Anhalt, Germany
 Wolfsberg Castle (Obertrubach), a ruined castle in Obertrubach, in Franconian Switzerland, Bavaria, Germany
Wolfsberg (district), a district of Carinthia, Austria
Wolfsberg im Schwarzautal, a municipality in Styria, Austria
Wolfsberg (Eggenfelden), a district of Eggenfelden, Bavaria, Germany
Wolfsberg (Sangerhausen), a district of Sangerhausen, Saxony-Anhalt, Germany
Wolfsberg, Thuringia, a former municipality, today part of Ilmenau, in the district Ilm-Kreis, Thuringia, Germany
Wolfsberg, the German name for Gărâna village, Brebu Nou Commune, Caraş-Severin County, Romania

Hills 
 Wolfsberg (Calenberg Land), a hill in Lower Saxony, Germany
 Wolfsberg (Haardt), a hill on which lies Wolfsburg Castle, Neustadt, Rhineland-Palatinate, Germany
 Wolfsberg (Hohegeiß), a hill in the Harz mountains, Germany
 Wolfsberg (Ilsenburg), a hill in the Harz mountains, Germany
 Wolfsberg (Saxon Switzerland), a hill in Saxony, Germany

In other uses
 Wolfsberger AC, a football club from Wolfsberg, Carinthia
 ATSV Wolfsberg, a football club in the third-tier Austrian Regional League Central
 Wolfsberg, a Nazi concentration camp near Breslau, where Holocaust survivor David Weiss Halivni and Hermann Kahan were taken during World War II
 Wolfsberg Aircraft Corporation, a Belgian aircraft manufacturer
 Wolfsberg Group, a private association of eleven global banks, founded in 2000 at the Schloss Wolfsberg, near Ermatingen, Switzerland
 Wolfsberg (adelsätt), a Swedish noble family

People 
 Joon Wolfsberg (born 1992), German singer-songwriter
 Christian Wolfsberg, Danish marathon champion
 Tyra Wolfsberg, American bioinformatician

See also
 Wolfsburg (disambiguation)